Project Baby 2 (also called Project Baby 2: All Grown Up on deluxe version) is the fifth mixtape  by American rapper Kodak Black. It was released on August 18, 2017, by Dollaz N Dealz, Sniper Gang and Atlantic. It included guest appearances from rappers XXXTentacion, Offset, John Wicks, JackBoy, Birdman & Lil Wayne.

The mixtape was supported by the singles "Transportin'" and "Roll in Peace" featuring XXXTentacion. Both songs have charted on the US Billboard Hot 100, with "Transportin'" peaking at number 46 and "Roll in Peace" peaking at 31.

Background
It was released two months after Kodak was released from jail. The album cover was shot in Pembroke Pines, Florida by photographer Ray Yau.

Critical reception
HotNewHipHop rated the mixtape 79% and described it as "complex and confounding".

Commercial performance
Project Baby 2 debuted at number two on the Billboard 200 with 50,000 album equivalent units, including 39,000 streaming equivalent units, and 8,000 being from pure sales. On December 4, 2018, the album was certified platinum by Recording Industry Association of America (RIAA) for combined sales and album-equivalent units of over a million units in the United States.

Track listing
Credits adapted from the album's liner notes and BMI.

Notes
  signifies an uncredited co-producer

Sample credits
 "Transportin'" contains a sample from "Hung Up On My Baby", written and performed by Isaac Hayes

Personnel
Credits adapted from the album's liner notes.

Technical
 Dyryk – recording 
 Lu Diaz – mixing 
 Chris Athens – mastering

Charts

Weekly charts

Year-end charts

Certifications

References 

2017 mixtape albums
Atlantic Records albums
Albums produced by Cubeatz
Albums produced by Frank Dukes
Albums produced by London on da Track
Albums produced by Murda Beatz
Kodak Black albums